Y G Mahendran (born 9 January 1950) is an Indian Actor, dramatist, actor, singer, playwright and comedian from the state of Tamil Nadu. He has acted in a number of plays and films. He is the son of Y. G. Parthasarathy, one of the pioneers of modern Tamil drama and Rajalakshmi Parthasarathy, founder and dean of Padma Seshadri Bala Bhavan group of schools, and nephew of veteran Tamil filmmaker K. Balaji. Mahendra is also the cousin of actress Vyjayanthimala and the co-brother of Rajinikanth and Mohanlal.

Early life and family
Y. G. Mahendran was born on 9 January 1950 to Y. G. Parthasarathy and Y. G. Rajalakshmi. Y. G. P. founded the United Amateur Artists (UAA), one of the first drama companies in Madras city, in the year 1952. His drama company was a success and he emerged as one of the foremost dramatists of his era. Mahendra's mother Mrs. Rajalakshmi (also called Mrs. Y.G.P.) was the founder of the Padma Seshadri Group of Schools. Starting from modest beginnings in a thatched shed in the terrace of the Y.G.P. home in 1959 with a batch of eleven students as an act of social service for the members of the Nungambakkam Recreation Club the school has since emerged as one of the best schools in India.

Hailing from a family of stage-lovers, Mahendra soon developed a liking for drama from his early days. He played the part of comedian in school plays and earned acclaim. On completion of his schooling from Don Bosco Egmore, he studied Chemical Engineering at A. C. College of Technology, Guindy and MBA. During his college days, he was touted as a prospective film actor. He was in his early teens when he joined his father's drama troupe, the United Amateur Artists (UAA). This gave him the desired break. His first few plays were huge successes attracting audiences by thousands. Mahendra's name had become one of the prominent names in the city. Eventually, he had to choose between acting and his career and he chose the former.

Y.G. Mahendran's daughter Madhuvanti is married to actor Gemini Ganesan and actress Savitri's grandson, V. Arunkumar.

Career
In 1971, Mahendra was cast by veteran director K. Balachander in the latter's film Navagraham. The film was an average grosser. Mahendra was discovered to have a nasal accent which made him funny. He acted in a variety of roles in a number of movies – particularly as a dim witted fool of a cousin – generally eclipsing roles enjoyed by Cho Ramaswamy in the 1960s and 1970s.

Mahendra's career spans over four decades and involves more than 200 movies. He also acted in supporting roles with actors such as Sivaji Ganesan, Jaishankar, Kamal Haasan and his brother-in-law, Rajinikanth. He acted with Rajinikanth in films such as Pokkiri Raja, Paayum Puli, Shri Raghavendra and Veera and with Kamal Haasan in movies such as Apoorva Raagangal, Neeya, Guru, etc.

Political Opinion

Speech on CAA 

Mahendra made reference to the ongoing Citizenship Amendment Act protests across India and the involvement of the student community and said the students go to the protests because they can get a leave on the day and they can cause ruckus and to check out the women standing in the crowd. His statements were criticized by different sections on social media. Singer Chinmayi criticised his comments and said, "Comments from men such as Y. G. Mahendran has to be brushed aside, because it's a waste of time speaking about them.

Business
Y.Gee, thanks to his brother in law, also began a parallel career in industrial ceramics and had a flourishing company established in 1982.
Y.Gee sold his ceramics business in 2001 for a whopping sum and has made a comeback into production and acting.

Partial filmography

Films

Television

Web series

As director
Y.G. Mahendra also has directed a Tamil film named Kathai Kathaiyam Karanamam in the year 1987.

Stage plays
 Venkata 3
 Vietnam Veedu
 Sudesi Iyer
 Thanthramukhi
 Kaadhalikka Neramundu
 Antha 7 Aatkal
 Ragasiyam Parama Ragasiyam
 Irandam Ragasiyam
 Soppana Vazhvil
 Kasedhan Kadavulada

Dubbing artist
Y.G. Mahendran dubbed for Kamal Haasan for Iru Nilavugal, the Tamil dubbed version of his Telugu film Sommokadidi Sokokadidi by imitating his voice.

Mahendran also dubbed for Telugu actor Babu Mohan for Idhuthaanda Police, Tamil dubbed version of Telugu film Ankusam.

Y. G. Mahendra also dubbed for Timon in the 1994's famous cartoon movie: The Lion King.

References

External links
 Y. Gee. Mahendra's Official Website
 

1950 births
Living people
Tamil comedians
Tamil dramatists and playwrights
Indian male film actors
Don Bosco schools alumni
Indian male dramatists and playwrights
Indian male comedians
Male actors from Chennai
Screenwriters from Chennai
20th-century Indian male actors
21st-century Indian male actors
20th-century Indian dramatists and playwrights
20th-century Indian male writers
Recipients of the Sangeet Natak Akademi Award